This list of stratigraphic units with indeterminate dinosaur fossils includes stratigraphic units of formation rank or higher that have produced dinosaur body fossils, although none of these remains have been referred to a specific genus in the scientific literature.

Europe

Africa and Middle East

Australasia and Antarctica

East Asia

Western Hemisphere

See also

List of dinosaur-bearing rock formations

Footnotes

References
 Weishampel, David B.; Dodson, Peter; and Osmólska, Halszka (eds.): The Dinosauria, 2nd, Berkeley: University of California Press. 861 pp. .

Indeterminiate dinosaur fossils